Philippe Lucas (born 1 November 1963 in Saint-Cloud, Hauts-de-Seine) is a French former professional footballer who played as a defensive midfielder. Whilst at Bordeaux he won the 1995 UEFA Intertoto Cup and played in the 1996 UEFA Cup Final.

References

External links
 
 

1963 births
Living people
Sportspeople from Saint-Cloud
French footballers
Association football midfielders
Ligue 1 players
Ligue 2 players
En Avant Guingamp players
FC Sochaux-Montbéliard players
FC Girondins de Bordeaux players
Footballers from Hauts-de-Seine